Goedenia is a genus of the family Tephritidae, better known as fruit flies.

Species
G. steyskali Goeden, 2002

References

Tephritinae
Tephritidae genera